An Ninh may refer to several places in Vietnam, including:

An Ninh, Hà Nam, a rural commune of Bình Lục District
An Ninh, Sóc Trăng, a rural commune of Châu Thành District
An Ninh, Quảng Bình, a rural commune of Quảng Ninh District
An Ninh, Quỳnh Phụ, a rural commune of Quỳnh Phụ District, Thái Bình Province
An Ninh, Tiền Hải, a rural commune of Tiền Hải District, Thái Bình Province

See also
An Ninh Đông, Long An, a rural commune of Đức Hòa District
An Ninh Đông, Phú Yên, a rural commune of Tuy An District
An Ninh Tây, Long An, a rural commune of Đức Hòa District
An Ninh Tây, Phú Yên, a rural commune of Tuy An District